Tulostoma is a genus of fungi in the family Agaricaceae. Species in the genus are commonly known as stalkballs, or stalked puffballs. Fossils of Tulostoma have been reported from 12 million year old rocks in central England and 13.5 million year old coals from Slovakia.

See also
List of Agaricaceae genera
List of Agaricales genera
List of Tulostoma species

References

External links

Agaricaceae
Agaricales genera